"A Little Bit of Good (Cures a Whole Lot of Bad)" aka "A Little Bit of Good" was a hit on the Hot Soul Singles Chart for soul duo Sam & Dave in 1974.

Background
The song was written by Gary Dalton and Kent Dubarri who were the duo Dalton & Dubarri. It was originally on their Good Head album which was released in 1974. Sam & Dave had their version released on the United Artists label. It marked their getting back together as a duo. Produced by Steve Cropper, it was from their album, Back Atcha which Cropper also produced.  It was the only song in the soul section of the Billboard Top Single Picks for May 18, 1974, the reviewer called it the kind of funky song that has always been their trade mark and that with the working of their vocals, it should hit both pop and soul.

Chart history
The single peaked at No. 89 on the Billboard Hot Soul Singles chart during a four-week run.

References

1974 songs
1974 singles
Sam & Dave songs
United Artists Records singles
Songs written by Gary Dalton
Songs written by Kent Dubarri